The Ethiopian Institute of Architecture, Building Construction and City Development (EiABC) is an institute for architectural and civil construction in Addis Ababa, Ethiopia.

History
In 1969, the Building College merged with the College of Engineering and formed the Faculty of Technology under Addis Ababa University, and remained as such until 2009.  On 6 March 2010, the institute was reformed into its current state as the Ethiopian Institute of Architecture, Building Construction and City Development.

References

External links
 EiABC official site
 Addis Abeba university
 ETH-EiABC Student Workshop | ETH Zurich
 EiABC

Universities and colleges in Ethiopia
1952 establishments in Ethiopia
Educational institutions established in 1952
Education in Addis Ababa
Architecture in Ethiopia
Urban planning